Highwood is one of two stations on Metra's Union Pacific North Line located in Highwood, Illinois. Highwood is located at 317 Green Bay Road. In Metra's zone-based fare system, Highwood is located in zone E. As of 2018, Highwood is the 159th busiest of Metra's 236 non-downtown stations, with an average of 242 weekday boardings.

Highwood station is located at grade level and has two side platforms which serve two tracks. An unstaffed station house which is open from 5:30 A.M. to 6:00 P.M. is located on the inbound (east) platform. A parking lot managed by the city is available for commuters at Highwood.

As of April 25, 2022, Highwood is served by 46 trains (23 in each direction) on weekdays, by 22 trains (11 in each direction) on Saturdays, and by eight trains (sixteen in each direction) on Sundays.

Bus connections
Pace

References

External links
Metra - Highwood
Station from Google Maps Street View

Metra stations in Illinois
Former Chicago and North Western Railway stations
Highwood, Illinois
Railway stations in Lake County, Illinois
Railway stations in the United States opened in 1962
Union Pacific North Line